Peter H. Ellaway is a British neuroscientist who is an emeritus professor of the Division of Neurosciences and Mental Health at Imperial College, London.  His awards include the Commemoration Medal, Charles University, Prague (1988).


External collaborations
Balgrist Institute, Zurich, Prof Volker Dietz
University of Alberta, Prof Arthur Prochazka

Editorial boards
Experimental Physiology, Reviewing Editor until 2005.
Journal of Physiology, Senior Ethical Editor since 2005; Reviewing Editor since 1999.

References

External links
 Professor Peter Ellaway Biography at Imperial College London
Emeritus Professor Peter Ellaway BSc PhD Biography at Inspire Foundation

Academics of Imperial College London
Living people
Year of birth missing (living people)